Thérèse Tréfouël (née Boyer, 19 June 1892 — 9 November 1978) was a French chemist. Along with her husband, Jacques Tréfouël, she is best known for her research on sulfamides, a novel class of antibiotic drugs.

Education and personal life 
Between 1913 and 1919, Tréfouël studied chemistry at the Faculté des Sciences, in Paris. She met her husband Jacques when they were assigned as lab partners after both failing to sign up to a practical course on time. Jacques and Thérèse married in 1921. They were known for the strength of their partnership and collaboration. Even after their retirement from scientific research, the Tréfouëls continued to collaborate on various projects: Jacques was fascinated by metalwork and woodwork, and would construct furniture which Thérèse upholstered.

Research and career 
In the early 1920s, Thérèse and her husband worked at the Pasteur Institute, in the laboratory of Ernest Fourneau — known as the father of medicinal chemistry. By studying derivatives of arsenic, they created drugs that could be used against syphilis (Stovarsol), African trypanosomiasis (Orsanine, moranyl), and malaria (Rodoquine). Stovarsol and Orsanine are both isomers of acetylaminohydroxyphenylarsonic acid. This was the first demonstration that isomers of the same molecule could have such different and specific properties. The Tréfouëls received several awards for this work, including the Prix Parkin from the Institut de France (1927), the Prix Louis (1932) and the Prix Paultre (1932) from the Académie de Médecine.

They are best known for their 1935 co-discovery, together with the pharmacologist Daniel Bovet and the bacteriologist Frederico Nitti, of sulfanilamide, a novel antibiotic.

In 1938, Jacques started his own laboratory at the Pasteur Institute. In 1940, Jacques was appointed as director of the institute, at which point Tréfouël took over the management of the laboratory. After the Second World War, the Tréfouëls continued their research into sulfamides. In 1954, they established the use of diaminodiphenyl sulfone for the treatment of leprosy and tuberculosis. Thérèse officially became the head of the laboratory in 1955, while Jacques served as the director of the Institute for a total of 24 years.

The Tréfouëls were nominated for a Nobel Prize in Chemistry in 1950. In 1955, they were nominated for the Prix du Conseil National de l'Ordre des Pharmaciens, for their lifetime achievements in medicinal chemistry.

Thérèse retired in 1963, and died in 1978, a year after her husband.

Legacy 

The Jacques and Thérèse Tréfouël Square in Paris was named after Tréfouël and her husband.

Bibliography 

 Traité de chimie organique / T. 22, Méthodes générales utilisées en chimie industrielle organique, grandes synthèses, matières colorantes, tanins et tannage, hauts polymères synthétiques, chimie du caoutchouc naturel, savons et produits similaires, parfumerie, industries de fermentation, chimiothérapie (1953)

References 

1892 births
1978 deaths
20th-century French women scientists
20th-century French chemists
French women chemists
French women academics